Brett Maluwelmeng (born February 19, 1985, in Sioux City, Iowa, United States) is a Guam professional footballer and football manager. He plays as a goalkeeper for Quality Distributors. He was still an active player in the Guam national football team from 2006 to 2011 and played at least 14 matches.

Brett Maluwelmeng is also a coach of the Guam women's national football team.

References

External links

Brett Simon Maluwelmeng at Soccerpunter.com

1985 births
Living people
Guamanian footballers
Guam international footballers
Quality Distributors players
Guamanian football managers
Association football forwards
Sportspeople from Sioux City, Iowa
Soccer players from Iowa